The , enacted in 1993, governs general functions of government agencies in Japan.

Chapters

 General Provisions
 Dispositions Upon Applications: Requires administrative agencies to implement concrete standards of review and indicate processing times for applications.
 Adverse Dispositions: Establishes procedures and evidentiary standards for hearings and rulings.
 Administrative Guidance: Establishes regulations for non-dispositive advice conducted by the government.
 Notifications
 Public Comment Procedure, Etc.

Exclusions

A number of government activities are excluded from the Act. These include:

 Diet, judicial and prosecutorial activities
 Law enforcement
 Tax and securities regulation
 Prisons
 Schools
 Immigration control

External links
 Text of the law (Japanese and English)

Japanese legislation
Government of Japan